The 1991–92 Segunda División B season was the 15th since its establishment. The first matches of the season were played on 31 August 1991, and the season ended in 28 June 1992 with the promotion play-off final games.

Overview before the season
80 teams joined the league, including five relegated from the 1990–91 Segunda División and 18 promoted from the 1990–91 Tercera División. The composition of the groups was determined by the Royal Spanish Football Federation, attending to geographical criteria.

Relegated from Segunda División
Orihuela
Elche
Salamanca
Levante
Xerez

Promoted from Tercera División

Fabril
Lalín
Mosconia
Valladolid B
Fraga
Logroñés B
Hernani
Tudelano
Gimnàstic
Oliva
Villarreal
Roldán
Marbella
Polideportivo Ejido
Villanovense
Portuense
Jaén
Maspalomas

Group 1
Teams from Asturias, Cantabria, Castile and Leon, Galicia, La Rioja and Navarre.

Teams

League table

Results

Top goalscorers

Top goalkeepers

Group 2
Teams from Andorra, Aragon, Balearic Islands, Basque Country, Catalonia and Navarre.

Teams

League table

Results

Top goalscorers

Top goalkeepers

Group 3
Teams from Castilla–La Mancha, Madrid, Region of Murcia and Valencian Community

Teams

League table

Results

Top goalscorers

Top goalkeepers

Group 4
Teams from Andalusia, Canary Islands, Extremadura and Melilla.

Teams

League table

Results

Top goalscorers

Top goalkeepers

Play-offs 

Segunda División B seasons
3
Spain